Villa Senar is an estate built in Switzerland by the Russian composer Sergei Rachmaninoff. He purchased the plot of land near Hertenstein on the shores of Lake Lucerne in 1932. The name of the estate originated from the names of Rachmaninoff and his wife: Sergei and Natalia, by combining the first two letters of each given name and the first of their surname.

The villa was designed to remind Rachmaninoff of the estate of Ivanovka the family had in southern Russia before the October Revolution and their migration to Western Europe in 1918. A park and a magnificent rose garden were laid at Senar. The Rachmaninoffs spent every summer at Senar until their final migration to the United States in 1939 at the outbreak of World War II. Two of Rachmaninoff's major compositions were written at Senar: Rhapsody on a Theme of Paganini completed in 1934 and the Third symphony completed in 1936. The villa hosted famous Russian immigrants, including Ivan Bunin and Vladimir Horowitz.

Rachmaninoff left Senar for the last time on 16 August 1939, going to Paris and preparing to move to New York City.

External links
 Михаил Шишкин, Русская Швейцария
Photographs of Villa Senar taken during production of The Joy of Rachmaninoff, BBC Four
Brochure with drawings, plans & pictures,

Sergei Rachmaninoff
Villas in Switzerland
Buildings and structures in the canton of Lucerne